The Five-Year Plans of Romania (Cincinal in Romanian, plural Cincinale) were economic development projects in Communist Romania, largely inspired by the Soviet model. Starting from 1951, there were 8 five-year plans.

Origins
In 1948, the Communists had fully taken over the power in Romania and started to nationalize property and means of production. They began forced economic development and industrialization by adopting the Soviet concept of five-year plans that set a number of goals to fulfill by the end of the terms. The first five-year plan started out in 1951.

Five-Year Plans

1951–1955

The first five-year plan took place between the years 1951 and 1955. Some of the 5 year plans are recorded on the countries postal stamp issues. They included:
 The move to save and or stabilise the forests that had trees older than 200 years.
 The reorganisation of farming and its efficiency.
 Industrialisation.
The five-year plan was adopted by the Great National Assembly on December 15, 1951. The main objective of the plan was the construction of the Danube–Black Sea Canal.

1956–1960

1961–1965

1966–1970
Nicolae Ceauşescu's regime gave a new impulse to industrialisation, and the accent was on developing the heavy industry. The goals of this five-year plan were allegedly attained in only four-and-a-half years; this was later used in many propaganda writings and songs.

1971–1975

1976–1980

1981–1985

1986–1989
The final five-year plan was intended to be completed in 1990. As the Communist regime ceased to exist in December 1989, the final five-year plan was cancelled and there were no subsequent five-year plans.

References

External links
Retrospective video about Five-Year Plans, Realitatea TV (Romanian)
Patriotic propaganda song about Five-Year Plans (Romanian)

Socialist Republic of Romania
Five-year plans